General John Longfield, CB (1805 – 27 February 1889) was an Irish senior officer in the British Army.

He was born the son of John Longfield into the well-established Longfield family of Longueville house, near Mallow, County Cork.  He was appointed an Ensign in the 8th (The King's) Regiment of Foot in 1825 and progressed through the ranks, becoming Lieutenant in 1828, Captain in 1835, Major in 1844, Lieutenant-Colonel in 1846 and Brevet Colonel in 1854.

He was Brigadier General in Bengal from May to November 1855, April to December 1856 and June 1857 to April 1859.  He commanded the 2nd Brigade at the Siege of Delhi, India in 1857 when his brigade was in reserve during the assault, and served in the city of Delhi during the following six days of fighting.

In 1860 he was promoted to Major General and on 19 April 1868 was appointed Colonel of the 29th Regiment of Foot. A year later he was promoted to Lieutenant-Colonel and to full General on 19 July 1876. Following the amalgamation of the 29th Foot with the 36th (Herefordshire) Regiment of Foot to create the Worcestershire Regiment Longfield continued as Colonel of the 1st Battalion of the new regiment until 1881 when he transferred back as Colonel of his old regiment, the 8th King's, a position he held until his death.

He died at Kilcoleman, near Bandon, Ireland on 27 February 1889.

References

|-

1805 births
1889 deaths
People from County Cork
British Army generals
King's Regiment (Liverpool) officers
29th Regiment of Foot officers
Worcestershire Regiment officers
British military personnel of the Indian Rebellion of 1857